"Oh Sheit It's X" is a song by American singer-songwriter Thundercat. He  it with record producers Flying Lotus, Mono/Poly, and Durand Furbee for his second studio album Apocalypse. Brainfeeder released it as a single on May 7, 2013. Musically, "Oh Sheit It's X" is a funk and disco song, whose lyrics describe the protagonist in an altered state of consciousness after consuming methylenedioxymethamphetamine—otherwise known as "ecstasy"—at a party.

The song was included in the video game Grand Theft Auto V and Thundercat performed it live at the Black Cab Sessions.

Background and composition

"Oh Sheit It's X" was written by Stephen "Thundercat" Bruner, Steven "Flying Lotus" Ellison, Charles "Mono/Poly" Dickerson, and Durand Furbee. Mono/Poly and Lotus  it and it runs at a tempo of 123 beats per minute. It is based on "the true story of an  New Year's party". Thundercat said it "was one of the most epic things that has ever happened ... Two and a half days of  shenanigans, man". In the song, Thundercat sings about feeling ecstatic while being in an altered state of consciousness caused by the drug of the same name. Scott Heins called it "a  party song" whose composition was based on "hard drums and  bass parts".

Music critics described it as a funk, disco,  and boogie funk act. Gabriel Szatan wrote for Beats Per Minute that as soon as the song starts with "a frazzled synth lead and sloppy kickdrums", Thundercat plays the bass guitar releasing his inner Jaco Pastorius. Other critics described its production as having a Bootsy-like "warbly funk" "virtuoso slap" bass; spatial and " synth stabs"; "weird disco strings", and a "four-on-the-floor beat". The bass chords flow through like a "bright bouncing ball" that "fizzle and pop [rapidly]".

Release and promotion
"Oh Sheit It's X" was released as single on May 7, 2013. It was one of the 214 songs originally featured in the 2013 video game Grand Theft Auto V, and was included on the FlyLo FM radio station, hosted by Lotus. Thundercat sang "Oh Sheit It's X" live at the Black Cab Sessions in 2015. Scott Heins said it sounded like a "tender [but goofy] ballad". In 2018, Joe Hertler & The Rainbow Seekers covered the song.

Critical reception

For Stereogum, Miles Bowe contrasted the energy present in "Oh Sheit It's X" with the previous single "Heartbreaks + Setbacks", adding that the former was created "for the hips" while the second for the head. While Jeremy D. Larson, from Consequence of Sound, compared the song with the works by Parliament-Funkadelic, an editor from Fact Magazine did it with the Shamen's "Ebeneezer Goode" and mentioned that  songs like "Oh Sheit It's X" are infrequently composed. Jonah Bromwich commented that no other musician has ever "sound[ed] so nonchalant about rolling".

The track was highlighted by various critics when they reviewed Apocalypse, Mike Diver considered "Oh Sheit It's X" to be similar to a collaboration between Justin Timberlake and Daft Punk, while other critics compared Thundercat's singing with that of Marvin Gaye and Frank Ocean. Additional commentary included being described as  "fantastic", "danceable", "romping [and] stomping", "a party grenade of wobbling funk", a "funk[y] and bracing" tune, and "the feel-good song of the year". The bassline was called "unreal" and "euphoric". Miles Bowe said the first thing one might say when listening to it is something like "Oh shit! That bass!"

The song was ranked at number 29 on Rolling Stones 100 Best Songs of 2013, with a commentary saying it was  most concentrated dose of disco joy [... and Thundercat] goes all the way pop with an irresistibly melodic groove". Chris Bodenner from The Atlantic named it the "Track of the Day" on December 19, 2015.

Track listing
Apocalypse (2013)
7. "Oh Sheit It's X" – 3:47

Digital single (2013)
1. "Oh Sheit It's X" – 3:47

Credits
Stephen "Thundercat" Bruner – songwriter, bass.
Steven "Flying Lotus" Ellison – songwriter, producer.
Charles "Mono/Poly" Dickerson – songwriter, producer.
Durand Furbee – songwriter.

References

External links
 at Brainfeeder's Official Channel.

2013 singles
2013 songs
American disco songs
Funk songs
Songs about drugs
Songs about parties
Songs written by Flying Lotus